Diogo de Melo was the 9th Captain-major of Portuguese Ceylon. Melo was appointed in 1565 under Sebastian of Portugal, he was Captain-major until 1568. He was succeeded by Fernando de Monroy.

References

Captain-majors of Ceilão
16th-century Portuguese people